The Supreme Soviet of the Byelorussian Soviet Socialist Republic (later renamed to Supreme Soviet of Belarus) of 12th convocation (1990–1995) was the first parliament in history of independent Belarus.

List of members of the Belarusian Parliament 

Uładzimir Hančaryk
Uładzimir Harkun
Alaksandar Hierasimienka
Ihar Hiermiančuk
Nil Hilevich
Valancin Hołubieŭ
Gennady Grushevoy
Myechyslaw Hryb
Vasily Dolgolyov
Mikałaj Damaškievič
Vasil Dvaraninovič
Mikalay Dzyemyantsyey
Inesa Drabyšeŭskaja
Alaksiej Kamaj
Jaŭhien Kanapla
Ivan Karatčenia
Viktar Karniajenka
Hienadź Karpienka
Vyachaslau Kebich
Leanid Kozik
Piotr Kraŭčanka
Anatol Kuźma
Vyacheslav Nikolayevich Kuznetsov
Alaksandr Kuličkoŭ
Viktar Kučynski
Anatol Labiedźka
Vasil Lavonaŭ
Alexander Lukashenko
Viačasłaŭ Lubavicki
Michaił Marynič
Mikałaj Markievič
Siarhei Navumchyk
Anatol Niatylkin
Zyanon Paznyak
Stanislau Shushkevich

1990
Lists of political office-holders in Belarus